The 26th New Zealand Parliament was a term of the New Zealand Parliament. It was elected at the 1938 general election in October of that year.

1938 general election

The 1938 general election was held on Friday, 14 October in the Māori electorates and on Saturday, 15 October in the general electorates, respectively.  A total of 80 MPs were elected; 48 represented North Island electorates, 28 represented South Island electorates, and the remaining four represented Māori electorates.  995,173 voters were enrolled and the official turnout at the election was 92.9%.

Sessions
The 26th Parliament sat for an unusual five sessions by omitting the 1941 general election, and was prorogued on 30 August 1943.

Ministries
The Labour Party had been in power since December 1935, and Michael Joseph Savage led the Savage Ministry. The opposition had consisted of the United Party and the Reform Party, which merged in 1936 during the term of the 25th Parliament to form the National Party. The First Labour Government was confirmed at the 1938 general election with an increased majority, and the Savage Ministry remained until Savage's death on 27 March 1940.

Savage was succeeded as Prime Minister by Peter Fraser, who formed the Fraser Ministry on 1 April 1940. The first Fraser Ministry resigned on 30 April 1940 and was reappointed, with some portfolios adjusted.

A War Cabinet was formed on 16 July 1940, which held the responsibility for all decisions relating to New Zealand's involvement in World War II. The War Cabinet was dissolved on 21 August 1945. For some months in 1942, a War Administration was in place. Formed on 30 June and dissolved on 2 October, the War Administration had responsibility for all war matters, with the War Cabinet as its executive body.

Party standings

Start of Parliament

End of Parliament

Initial composition of the 26th Parliament

The following table shows the initial composition of the 26th Parliament:

Changes
There were a number of changes during the term of the 26th Parliament.

Notes

References

26